Philip Ray (born Roy Edgar Cochrane, 1 November 1898 – 11 May 1978) was a British stage, film and television actor. Occasionally credited as Phil Ray, he played numerous and varied supporting roles, particularly in films and on television.
He also saw military service in both WWI and WWII.

Selected filmography

 Old Roses (1935) - Minor Role (uncredited)
 Blue Smoke (1935) - Jan
 Sexton Blake and the Bearded Doctor (1935) - Jim Cameron
 Twelve Good Men (1936) - Higgs
 Find the Lady (1936) - (uncredited)
 Not So Dusty (1936) - Dan Stevens
 Head Office (1936) - Gerrard
 Dark Journey (1937) - Faber
 The Perfect Crime (1937) - Newbold
 Farewell Again (1937) - Moore
 The Man Who Made Diamonds (1937) - Tompkins
 Second Best Bed (1938) - Stanley Hurley 
 Mr. Reeder in Room 13 (1938) - Fenner
 Double or Quits (1938) - Hepworth
 It's in the Air (1938) - Airman with Shoe (uncredited)
 The Nursemaid Who Disappeared (1939)
 Wanted by Scotland Yard (1939) - Ben
 Jamaica Inn (1939) - Undetermined Role (uncredited)
 The Door with Seven Locks (1940) - Tom Cawler
 Send for Paul Temple (1946) - Horace Daley 
 The October Man (1947) - Stebbins
 Fame Is the Spur (1947) - Doctor (uncredited)
 Miranda (1948) - Fisherman (uncredited)
 The Winslow Boy (1948) - First Speaking Member (uncredited)
 Adam and Evalyn (1949) - Gambler (uncredited)
 No Place for Jennifer (1950) - Mr. Marshall
 Night and the City (1950) - Man (uncredited)
 The Adventurers (1951) - Man in Restaurant
 No Highway in the Sky (1951) - Burroughs (uncredited)
 Emergency Call (1952) - Captain Wilcox
 Derby Day (1952) - 2nd Newspaper Reporter (uncredited)
 The Net (1953) - Sentry (uncredited)
 The Story of Gilbert and Sullivan (1953) - Theatre manager
 The Fake (1953) - Bearded Tramp
 Gilbert Harding Speaking of Murder (1953) - Theatre manager
 Trouble in Store (1953) - Girls' Hostel Caretaker (uncredited)
 Hell Below Zero (1954) - Capt. Petersen
 The Good Die Young (1954) - Promoter (uncredited)
 Before I Wake (1955) - Station master
 Where There's a Will (1955) - Squire Stokes
 Passage Home (1955) - River pilot
 The Extra Day (1956) - John Bliss
 No Road Back (1957) - Garage man
 The Secret Place (1957) - Mr. Venner (uncredited)
 Count Five and Die (1957)
 Dunkirk (1958) - Extra (uncredited)
 A Night to Remember (1958) - Reverend Anderson
 Sapphire (1959) - Mr. Young (uncredited)
 Date at Midnight (1959) - Jenkins
 Sons and Lovers (1960) - Dr. Ansell
 No Love for Johnnie (1961) - M.P - House of Commons Entrance Area (uncredited)
 Backfire! (1962) - Coroner
 In the Doghouse (1962) - Vicar (uncredited)
 Panic (1963) - Jessop
 The Mind Benders (1963) - Father (uncredited)
 Devil Doll (1964) - Uncle Walter (uncredited)
 Dracula: Prince of Darkness (1966) - Priest
 Frankenstein Created Woman (1967) - Mayor
 Doctor Who: The Seeds of Death (1969) - Daniel Eldred

References

External links
 

1898 births
1978 deaths
British male stage actors
British male film actors
British male television actors
Male actors from London
20th-century British male actors